Gote or Göte can refer to the following:

People
Göte Almqvist (1921 – 1994), Swedish ice hockey player
Göte Andersson (1909 – 1975), Swedish water polo player who competed in the 1936 Summer Olympics
Göte Blomqvist (1928 – 2003), Swedish ice hockey player
Göte Carlsson, Swedish sprint canoer who competed in the late 1930s
Göte Dahl, Swedish footballer who played as forward
Göte Hagström, (1918 – 2014), Swedish athlete
Göte Malm, Swedish footballer who played as midfielder
Göte Rosengren, Swedish footballer who played as defender
Göte Strandsjö (1916 – 2001), Swedish hymnwriter
Göte Turesson (1892 – 1970), Swedish evolutionary botanist
Göte Wahlström (born 1951), Swedish politician
Göte Wälitalo (born 1956), Swedish ice hockey goaltender

Other uses
 Gote, a strategic concept in the game of Go
GOTE, an acronym to remind actors of four basic elements to consider while preparing a character for the theater

See also
Goethe (disambiguation)